Hubert Pawłowski (born 21 January 1956) is a Polish sports shooter. He competed in the mixed skeet event at the 1980 Summer Olympics.

References

1956 births
Living people
Polish male sport shooters
Olympic shooters of Poland
Shooters at the 1980 Summer Olympics
Sportspeople from Warsaw